William Dory was an American Yiddish-language recording artist with a brief career at the start of the twentieth century. 

His repertoire consisted mainly of Yiddish Theatre music and novelty songs (1900-1901) recorded on Wax cylinder for Edison Records (aka National Phonograph Co.). Although little is known about his personal or professional life, he was one of the first Yiddish-language recording artists in the United States. After he made eleven recordings for Edison (listed in 2 annual catalogs), he was replaced on their roster by Frank Seiden, who re-recorded Dory's general material on the new black-wax moulded cylinders (1902), and some specific titles of his as well.

Selected recordings
, Religious (1900, Edison Records)
, from The Pretty Miriam (1900, Edison Records, written by Sigmund Mogulesko)
 (1900, Edison Records)
, from The Jew in Morocco (1900, Edison Records, from an unpublished play by Peretz Sandler and Sigmund Feinman)
 (1900, Edison Records)
, Hebrew song (1901, Edison Records)
 (1901, Edison Records)
 (1901, Edison Records)
 (1901, Edison Records)
 (1901, Edison Records, probably from the opera The Yiddish King Lear by Jacob Gordin)

References

Edison Records artists
Yiddish theatre performers
19th-century births
20th-century deaths
Jewish singers